Lori Altshuler (August 23, 1957 – November 5, 2015) was a professor at the University of California, Los Angeles (UCLA) Department of Psychiatry and Biobehavioral Sciences and held the Julia S. Gouw Endowed Chair for Mood Disorders. Altshuler was the Director of the UCLA Mood Disorders Research Program and the UCLA Women's Life Center, each being part of the Neuropsychiatric Hospital at UCLA.

Education and early career
Altshuler received both her Bachelor of Arts in Psychology (1978) and her M.D. degree (1982) from Cornell University, where she was a member of the Quill and Dagger society. From 1982–1983 she interned at UCLA's Center for Health Sciences/Wadsworth Veterans Administration. She completed her residency at the UCLA Neuropsychiatric Institute and Hospital in 1986. Altshuler completed a two-year fellowship at the Biological Psychiatry Branch of the National Institute of Mental Health (NIMH) from 1987 to 1989.

During her residency, Altshuler completed several postmortem and clinical research projects while in training with mentors Arnold Scheibel, M.D. and Jeffrey Cummings, M.D. These foreshadowed her interests in neuroscience and led to her fellowship in Washington D.C. At the NIMH intramural laboratories, she continued this work, completing several projects related to postmortem differences in the brains of patients with schizophrenia and mood disorders. She cemented her clinical interest to study patients with bipolar illness during her fellowship in biological psychiatry at NIMH. There, she was a pioneer in using magnetic resonance imaging (MRI), an in vivo technique to assess structural changes in the brains of patients with psychiatric disorders.

In 1989, Altshuler joined the UCLA Department of Psychiatry faculty, where she has been a professor for more than 25 years. She has consistently played a major leadership role in the research, teaching/mentoring, and clinical care missions of the Department of Psychiatry at UCLA, as well as the broader global community of psychiatrists and psychiatric research.

Research interests
Altshuler has developed and pursued clinical and basic research in three primary areas: neuroanatomic and cognitive abnormalities in the major psychoses, course and treatment of bipolar illness and pharmacologic treatment of psychiatric disorders specific to women.

Altshuler's research on neuroanatomic abnormalities in patients with severe mental illnesses has focused on both the gross and histologic/receptor level and has identified the specificity of abnormal brain functioning for a given psychiatric disorder and phase of illness. For example, she was the first to identify that the amygdala is activated when bipolar patients enter a manic state and lower among patients in a depressed state. She concurrently demonstrated that orbitofrontal activation is persistently lower among persons with bipolar disorder, a trait-like reaction. These findings differentiate bipolar disorder from schizophrenia and other psychotic disorders.

These findings regarding basic brain functioning complement her clinically-focused research which has improved the quality of care for persons with bipolar disorders. She has conducted several multi-site collaborative studies evaluating the optimal medication and treatment strategies for persons with bipolar disorder. For example, most psychiatrists withdraw treatment with antidepressants after symptoms remit following a depressive episode. However, her work has demonstrated that patients who achieve a positive acute antidepressant response to 10 weeks of antidepressant treatment adjunctive to a mood stabilizer will probably maintain response with the same continued treatment with risk of manic episode no higher than the reported rate for patients on mood stabilizer monotherapy.

She has also devoted her career to focusing on how these disorders are best managed among women in different phases of their life. In particular, she has studied non-depressed women (who have previously had at least one episode of unipolar depression), following them during pregnancy and the post-partum period. Her work found that women who discontinued antidepressant medication relapsed significantly more frequently (68%) over the course of their pregnancy compared with women who maintained their medication (26%). This study dispelled the myth that pregnancy was protective against depression and, more importantly, provided an evidence-based foundation for women and their physicians to weigh the risks and benefits of continuing versus discontinuing antidepressant medications during pregnancy.

Over the last 25 years, the importance of this work has been recognized by National Institutes of Health (NIH), as she has received more than 22 federal grants supporting this work. Concurrently, the Veterans Administration also provided a series of grants. She has received both support to advance her career, recognizing her leadership in psychiatry, as well as large randomized controlled trials and basic neuroscience grants to advance our understanding of how brain functioning differs between persons with a psychiatric disorder and not.

In addition to NIH funding, she has received a series of grants from private foundations (e.g., Stanley Foundation, MSST Foundation, and Swift Foundation) and small grants from pharmaceutical companies (Abbott, Eli Lilly, Parke-Davis, Solvay). These awards supported not only her own research, but allowed her to train the next generation of psychiatrists in clinical research.

Career
As Director of the UCLA Mood Disorder Research Program, Altshuler created a collaborative clinical research infrastructure within the Department of Psychiatry that would span both the UCLA and the Veterans Administration, Brentwood sites. The Mood Disorders Research Program focuses primarily on the etiology and treatment of bipolar disorder and major depression. The Women's Research Program is an adjunct to the Mood Disorders Research Program that has attracted national attention with its focus on depression during phases of life specific to women.

Altshuler has mentored approximately 8-12 people per year, from new graduates to junior faculty. She has cultivated the careers of both fellows and junior faculty who have published productively, received academic appointments and created research programs at prestigious universities and received federal funding under her mentorship.

Publications
Over the past 30 years, Altshuler has published over 265 articles in peer-reviewed journals, 25 chapters in edited volumes, has been invited to give more than 50 major plenary addresses and lectures and her research has been presented in 175 posters and abstracts at national and international meetings. More than 15 of her published articles reviewed a specific scientific issue, providing new insights and analyses to the psychiatric clinical or research community. She has repeatedly published in the most prestigious journals for both medicine (Journal of the American Medical Association, Brain) and psychiatry (Archives of General Psychiatry, American Journal of Psychiatry, and Biological Psychiatry). In addition, she has published more than 27 letters to respond and comment on cutting-edge research by others.

Appointments
Director, Outpatient Research, Mental Health Clinic, VA Medical Center - West Los Angeles 1991–1995
Chief, Bipolar Disorders Clinic, Mental Health Clinic, Veterans Administration Medical Center (West Los Angeles), 1991–2009
Director of Research, Women's Life Center, UCLA Neuropsychiatric Hospital, 1995–2010
Director of Mood Disorders Research, Mental Health Clinic Veterans Administration Medical Center (West Los Angeles) and the UCLA Mood Disorders Clinic, 1995–2015
Julia S. Gouw Professor of Psychiatry Department of Psychiatry and Biobehavioral Sciences, UCLA Neuropsychiatric Hospital, 1999–2015

Honors and awards
Daniel X. Freedman Young Investigator Award (NARSAD)
Outstanding Research Mentor Award and Outstanding Teacher during multiple years, UCLA Department of Psychiatry
Judith Silver Young Scientist Award, National Association of the Mentally Ill
Veterans Administration Center of Excellence: Outpatient Bipolar Clinic
Gerald L. Klerman Young Investigator Award, National Depressive, Manic-Depressive Association
Best Doctors in America® from 1996 to 2000, 2007–2008
Distinguished Fellow, American Psychiatric Association
Outstanding Research Mentor Award, UCLA Department of Psychiatry
Julia S. Gouw Endowed Chair in Mood Disorders
Gerald L. Klerman Distinguished Investigator Award, DBSA
NARSAD's Falcone Prize for Outstanding Achievement in Affective Disorders Research
Southern California Psychiatric Society Award for Outstanding Achievement in Mood Disorders
American College of Psychiatrists Award for Research in Mood Disorders

References

External links
Lori L. Altshuler at the David Geffen School of Medicine at UCLA

1957 births
2015 deaths
American women psychiatrists
American psychiatrists
David Geffen School of Medicine at UCLA faculty
Weill Cornell Medical College alumni
Cornell University alumni
American women academics
21st-century American women
People from Englewood, New Jersey